Johann Sebastian Bach composed the church cantata  (Where shall I flee), 5, in Leipzig for the 19th Sunday after Trinity and first performed it on 15 October 1724. The chorale cantata is based on the hymn "" by Johann Heermann.

History and words 
Bach wrote the cantata in his second year in Leipzig for the 19th Sunday after Trinity and first performed it on 15 October 1724. It is part of his second annual cycle of cantatas, a cycle of chorale cantatas. The prescribed readings for the Sunday were from Paul's Epistle to the Ephesians – "put on the new man, which after God is created" – and from the Gospel of Matthew, Healing the paralytic at Capernaum.

The cantata text is based on the hymn in eleven stanzas "" by Johann Heermann, published in 1630, which is recommended for the Sunday in the Dresdner Gesangbuch. The hymn tune is "Auf meinen lieben Gott". An unknown poet kept the first and last stanzas as the respective cantata movements. He paraphrased the other stanzas rather freely: 2 and 3 as movement 2, 4 as movement 3, 5 to 7 as movement 4, 8 as movement 5, and 9 and 10 as movement 6. A year before, Bach had composed for the occasion Ich elender Mensch, wer wird mich erlösen, BWV 48, concentrating on the promise of Jesus to the sick man: "Your sins are forgiven". Similarly, the awareness of being a sinner who needs healing is the theme of Heermann's chorale and this cantata. In movement 5 the poet invented a ferocious, hellish army, which is silenced by the believer who shows the blood of Jesus.

Bach first performed the cantata on 15 October 1724. The autograph score to the cantata, now in the Stefan Zweig Collection of the British Library, was once owned by Joseph Joachim.

Scoring and structure 
The cantata in seven movements is scored for four vocal soloists (soprano, alto, tenor, and bass), a four-part choir, tromba da tirarsi (slide trumpet), two oboes, two violins, viola and basso continuo.

Music 
Bach arranged the movements in symmetry around movement 4 as the turning point in the cantata between desolation and hope, a recitative, which receives added weight by the cantus firmus of the chorale played by the oboe. One line of the chorale stanza is sung unchanged: "" (the sins I committed).

In the opening chorus Bach gave the tune in unadorned long notes to the soprano, reinforced by the trumpet. The vocal parts are embedded in an independent instrumental concerto. The motifs of the instruments, which also appear in the lower voices, are derived from the tune, following the upward movement of its first line and the downward movement of its second line. Both other recitatives are secco. The first aria is accompanied only by an obbligato viola illustrating the flow of blood, termed by John Eliot Gardiner the "gushing, curative effect of the divine spring" in "tumbling liquid gestures", summarized as "the cleansing motions of some prototype baroque washing machine". The tenor sings the same figuration on the word "" (washing). Bach used the solo viola only rarely in his cantatas (twice, according to Boyd); he may have played these solos himself. The second aria is accompanied by the full orchestra with the trumpet as a "ferociously demanding obbligato". In sudden breaks it conveys the silencing of "" (Be silent, host of hell). Different as the two arias are, the figuration in the second one is similar to the one in the first, interpreting that it is the very flow of blood which silences the "army of hell". The closing chorale is set for four parts.

Recordings 
 J. S. Bach: Das Kantatenwerk – Sacred Cantatas Vol. 1, Nikolaus Harnoncourt, Wiener Sängerknaben, Chorus Viennensis, Concentus Musicus Wien, soloist of the Wiener Sängerknaben, Paul Esswood, Kurt Equiluz, Max van Egmond, Teldec 1972
 Bach Cantatas Vol. 5 – Sundays after Trinity II, conductor Karl Richter, Münchener Bach-Chor, Münchener Bach-Orchester, Edith Mathis, Trudeliese Schmidt, Peter Schreier, Dietrich Fischer-Dieskau, Archiv Produktion 1978
 Die Bach Kantate Vol. 54, Helmuth Rilling, Gächinger Kantorei, Württembergisches Kammerorchester Heilbronn, Arleen Augér, Carolyn Watkinson, Aldo Baldin, Wolfgang Schöne, Hänssler 1979
 J. S. Bach: Complete Cantatas Vol. 11, Ton Koopman, Amsterdam Baroque Orchestra & Choir, Sibylla Rubens, Annette Markert, Christoph Prégardien, Klaus Mertens, Antoine Marchand 1999
 Bach Edition Vol. 19 – Cantatas Vol. 9, conductor Pieter Jan Leusink, Holland Boys Choir, Netherlands Bach Collegium, Ruth Holton, Sytse Buwalda, Nico van der Meel, Bas Ramselaar, Brilliant Classics 2000
 Bach Cantatas Vol. 10: Potsdam / Wittenberg / For the 19th Sunday after Trinity / For  the Feast of Reformation, John Eliot Gardiner, Monteverdi Choir, English Baroque Soloists, Joanne Lunn, William Towers, James Gilchrist, Peter Harvey, Soli Deo Gloria 2000
 J. S. Bach: Cantatas Vol. 27 – Cantatas from Leipzig 1724, Masaaki Suzuki, Bach Collegium Japan, Susanne Rydén, Pascal Bertin, Gerd Türk, Peter Kooy, BIS 2003

References

External links 

 
 Wo soll ich fliehen hin BWV 5; BC A 145 / Chorale cantata (19th Sunday after Trinity) Bach Digital
 Cantata BWV 5 Wo soll ich fliehen hin history, scoring, sources for text and music, translations to various languages, discography, discussion, Bach Cantatas Website
 BWV 5 Wo soll ich fliehen hin English translation, University of Vermont
 BWV 5 Wo soll ich fliehen hin text, scoring, University of Alberta
 Luke Dahn: BWV 5.7 bach-chorales.com

Church cantatas by Johann Sebastian Bach
1724 compositions
Stefan Zweig Collection
Chorale cantatas